Queen's Valley may refer to:

 Valley of the Queens, Egypt
 Queen's Valley Reservoir, Jersey